China–Netherlands relations officially began in November 1954.  In May 1972, diplomatic mission was increased to ambassadorial level.

History 

China-Dutch relations began prior to the founding of the People's Republic of China in the 17th and 18th century when Dutch traders of the Verenigde Oostindische Compagnie (VOC) setup trading post in Canton and also in the western coast of Taiwan.

PRC–Netherlands began in 1954. In the 1980s Taiwan ordered two submarines from a Dutch shipyard which were delivered despite tremendous Chinese pressure. China accused the Netherlands of colluding with American President Ronald Reagan and downgraded relations with the Netherlands and threatened to do the same to the US. In 1984 the Netherlands agreed not to export additional military goods in order to restore relations.

Netherlands export to China includes petrochemicals, machinery, transport equipment, food, high technology and fossil fuels. China's export to the Netherlands includes computer and consumer electronics, toys and clothes.

In March 2014, Chinese leader and CCP general secretary Xi Jinping made the first state visit of China to the Netherlands in history.

Bilateral relations 

Bilateral trade between the two countries have increased over the years. The Netherlands are China's third largest trade partner in the EU. The trade volume jumped last year has increased by 44.3 percent. This is 4.6 billion euro in 2009. China exported $36.7 billion to the Netherlands in 2009.

Dutch enterprises have invested US$7.48 billion into 824 projects in China.

In July 2019, the UN ambassadors from 22 nations, including Netherlands, signed a joint letter to the UNHRC condemning China's mistreatment of the Uyghurs as well as its mistreatment of other minority groups, urging the Chinese government to close the Xinjiang re-education camps.

In February 2021, the Dutch House of Representatives voted to recognize the Chinese government's treatment of its Uyghur Muslim minority as genocide, becoming the first country in the European Union to do so.

See also 
Chinese people in the Netherlands
Chinese people in Europe
Dutch people in China
China–European Union relations
Marc van der Chijs, Dutch co-founder of popular Chinese video-sharing website Tudou

References

External links 
Nederlandse Ambassade in Peking, China 
Embassy of the People's Republic of China in the Kingdom of the Netherlands  

 
Netherlands
Bilateral relations of the Netherlands